Dawn Patrol is the debut studio album by American hard rock band Night Ranger, released on November 1, 1982, by Neil Bogart's The Boardwalk Entertainment Co.

Background
During the recording of the album, the band was known as just Ranger. The first issues of the album were printed and ready to be shipped when  a country band from California was found to have the same name. The band decided to name themselves Night Ranger after the song that Blades had written for the album, and Boardwalk proceeded to destroy every copy that had "Ranger" on it.

Release
"Don't Tell Me You Love Me", the first single, which had a music video that entered heavy rotation on MTV, reached number 40 on the Billboard Hot 100 and number four on Billboard's Mainstream Rock Tracks chart.

The second single, "Sing Me Away", reached number 54 on the Hot 100 and  number 39 on the Mainstream Rock Tracks chart in late spring of 1983.

Track listing

Personnel
Night Ranger
 Jack Blades – bass, lead vocals
 Jeff Watson – guitars
 Brad Gillis – guitars
 Alan Fitzgerald – keyboards
 Kelly Keagy – drums, lead vocals

Production
 Pat Glasser – producer
 John Van Nest – engineer
 Tucker Williamson – studio assistant
 Brian Gardner – mastering
 Mike Beard – graphic effects

Charts

Album

Singles

References

Further reading

1982 debut albums
Night Ranger albums
Glam metal albums